Rita is a 1959 Australian television play starring Rosalind Keene. It is a recording of an opera by Donizetti.

Cast
Joe Jenkins		
Rosalind Keene as Rita
Ereach Riley as Beppo
Russell Smith as Gasparo

See also
List of live television plays broadcast on Australian Broadcasting Corporation (1950s)

References

External links

Australian television films
Australian television plays based on operas
Films directed by Alan Burke (director)